Alfio Ovidio Oviedo Álvarez (born 18 December 1995) is a Paraguayan footballer who plays for Libertad and the Paraguay national football team.

International career
Alfio has been called to the U-20 team but only for friendlies. In the senior team, he had his chance being called for made his debut for "La Albirroja" Paraguay by the coach Francisco Arce for the friendly match against the Mexico national team in Seattle on July 1, 2017, where he made his debut at 88'.

External links

 

1995 births
Living people
Paraguayan footballers
Paraguayan expatriate footballers
Paraguay international footballers
Association football forwards
Club Rubio Ñu footballers
Independiente F.B.C. footballers
Cerro Porteño players
Newell's Old Boys footballers
Club Libertad footballers
Paraguayan Primera División players
Argentine Primera División players
Paraguayan expatriate sportspeople in Argentina
Expatriate footballers in Argentina